Abubakar Mahdi was elected Senator for the Borno South constituency of Borno State, Nigeria at the start of the Nigerian Fourth Republic, running on the People's Democratic Party (PDP) platform. He took office on 29 May 1999.
 
After taking his seat in the Senate he was appointed to committees on Security & Intelligence, Foreign Affairs (Vice-Chairman), Power & Steel, Federal Character and Federal Capital Territory.

References

Living people
Nigerian Muslims
Peoples Democratic Party members of the Senate (Nigeria)
20th-century Nigerian politicians
21st-century Nigerian politicians
Year of birth missing (living people)
People from Borno State